Arthur Foster (born 1869) was an English footballer who played in the Football League for Stoke.

Career
Foster was born in Stoke-upon-Trent and played amateur football with Hanley Town prior to joining Stoke in 1893. He struggled to establish himself in the first team and after making just seven appearances he left for border club Oswestry Town.

Career statistics

References

English footballers
Hanley Town F.C. players
Oswestry Town F.C. players
Stoke City F.C. players
English Football League players
1869 births
Year of death missing
Association football fullbacks